True Faith is a band from the Philippines, formed in 1991. They have become one of the Philippines' most popular and accomplished bands.

The band took its name from New Order's 1987 hit single "True Faith", revealing the group's new wave origins. At first, True Faith mined mid-1980s new wave sounds for its breezy pop formula, but the group eventually ventured further into the Philippine mainstream, firmly embracing middle of the road radio. Under the Viva Records label, the band has 13 best-selling albums.

Early career
In 1993, a demo tape of the band's song "Perfect", a romantic ballad with jangling guitars and longing vocals à la the Railway Children and the Lotus Eaters, hit number one on the Manila Top 40 radio station 99.5 RT FM (now 99.5 Play FM). The accessibility of "Perfect" opened the doors to the masses, a much larger crowd than the cult of fans who watched them perform new wave covers in small clubs. Signed to EMI Music in the Philippines, True Faith's 1995 album, Build, was the group's first big smash, elevating it to superstar status in its native land.

Awards
Through the distinct powerful voice of its lead singer and founder, Medwin Marfil, the band was able to amass numerous music awards and nominations highlighted in the summer of 2000 by a Music Television Asia award for Best Video Award for the video "Awit Para Sa Kanya" (Song For Her). Although True Faith didn't win, the nomination brought the band back into the public spotlight. Memories Are Cheap: The Best of Truefaith, 1993-2000, Produced by Truefaith and Darrell James Laxamana, was also released that year, a hugely successful overview of Truefaith's success and a look at how the group evolved from its new wave roots to becoming an easy listening icon. The album featured a new track "Kung O.K. Lang Sa'yo", a one-acoustic guitar ballad featuring then new member Jay Valencia on guitars. This album also includes a remix version of "Get It On".

As they toured the Philippines through colleges, club circuits and radio stations, they continued to build a strong following. "Faithfools", the moniker the fans called themselves, look upon the group to hear songs they have popularised like "Perfect", "Sumasarap ang Gising", and "Dedma".

Truefaith has played alongside famous artists like The Dawn, the late Ric Segreto, Kuh Ledesma, Kulay and many more. They were slated to perform in the United States in the fall of 2005.

The band are mostly popular for singing the theme song for Sa Piling Mo entitled "Dahil Ikaw". This song bagged the Favourite Media Soundtrack category in the 2007 Myx Music Awards.

Nevertheless, for many observers, Truefaith's nomination was a welcome boost to a roller-coaster career that dates back to their 1993 hit song "Perfect", which started life as a demo that spent countless weeks as the no. 1 song on the competitive 99.5 RT Top 40 chart. After riding high as one of the country's top pop bands, Truefaith peaked with their 1995 album Build, which spawned several hit singles such as "Alaala" and "Kundi Rin Lang Ikaw".

Legal action
Build was followed by a messy episode that involved a court case between co-founder and lead singer Medwin Marfil and three founding band members over the use of the band name. An out of court settlement ensued, with Medwin winning full rights to the name. He reformed the band with some old and new members and recorded two more studio albums for the Octoarts-EMI label. In 2006, the band regained its stride with a top-selling greatest hits album and the nomination of the band's video (by award-winning video director Robert Quebral) which put them back on the A-List.

New sound
In May 2001, at an MTV event in Makati, the band unveiled a new twist in its sound with the inclusion of a three-piece horn section composed of seasoned members of leading big band Ugoy Ugoy. The result is a more organic soul-based sound that veers away from the electronica splashes added by co-producer (and in-demand remixer) Brian Cua in their last studio outing.

2002 and beyond
Grace (2002), the band's next album, was welcomed with lukewarm response. Touted as a return to the pop rock realm, it was not able to meet the expectations of fans and even the band weren't as happy as they were with previous efforts. The single "Dedma" initially made much of a stir with its video that featured FHM cover girl Diana Zubiri. All else fizzled into oblivion. True fans would disagree: they’d argue that tracks like "Come Back Home" and "Medusa" would have made great singles. As Medwin recalls today, the group wasn't given ample time to polish the record into how it should be. The record company was also undergoing management personnel changes which didn't help either. He also remembers that aside from Slapshock and other rap metal bands, the band scene wasn't as vibrant as it used to be. This seeming limbo-like state of the band scene was followed by another music trend, a trend that Truefaith would be a bit player of sorts.

In 2004, Truefaith released Eto Hits… Acoustic. Convinced that the band pioneered the unplugged side of OPM in the early 1990s, EMI decided to release a compilation of old Truefaith songs in their original acoustic arrangement or re-done to suit the theme. It also included a cover of the Culture Club classic, "Mistake No. 3". The collection did quite well.

After 2 years of absence from the recording scene, Truefaith returned in a big way with the launch of their 11th album, Stray To Be Found. Powered by the first single, the mega ballad "Dahil Ikaw" (which is the theme song to the teleserye Sa Piling Mo), the band made their comeback in a spectacular manner. Not to be left out in the burgeoning "new band wave", they have once again proven to be a force to reckon with in the local music industry. A couple of years back, Benedict Esguerra and Kenneth Ilagan entered the band as drummer and guitarist respectively. Two years was just enough time for them to gel with the band. After "Dahil Ikaw", the singles, "Sayang Ang Lahat", "Cross My Heart" (a cover of an EBTG classic), and "Araw’t Gabi" were released. All the videos for these singles became a regular fare in MYX's Daily Top 10. (The album also included covers of the band's favourites: Crowded House's "Four Seasons in One Day", and Fra Lippo Lippi's "Crazy Wisdom".)

The video for "Dahil Ikaw" was one of the most viewed in 2006, and was nominated in two categories at the MYX Music Awards of 2007, consequently winning in the soundtrack category. It was directed by Genghis Jimenez.

In October 2005, the band went to the US for their 1st American Tour. They played two shows around San Francisco, San Diego, New York and two shows in L.A. Medwin believes that the popularity of the song "Dahil Ikaw" has only increased the chances of them going back to America and possibly a tour of Europe to entertain Filipinos there. It is no wonder that the song that ushered their comeback has paved the way for them to play internationally. From 2006 to 2008, they did shows in Taiwan, Hong Kong, Singapore and Malaysia. In June 2009, Medwin and Eugene did a special acoustic show in Dubai which was very successful.

To celebrate Truefaith's contribution to OPM and their years in EMI Philippines, the record label compiled all of the band's most memorable hits and other less popular-yet-beautiful tracks. Dubbed as Dream Journal: The Very Best Of Truefaith 1993-2007, the two-disc 32-track album chronicles Truefaith's journey through songs that endeared them to the listening public and cemented the band's reputation as certified hit makers.

Truefaith has just recently signed up with Viva Records and is currently recording for the new album. The new album titled, Love Parade for the Life Brigade was slated for an Oct release. According to Medwin, the band is experiencing some delays but reassures all fans of the band that it will be out way before 2009 ends.

Released in March 2010, Love Parade features an eclectic mix of special guests from soul prince, Luke Mejares, saxophone wiz, Dix Lucero (on the 80's influenced inspirational track "Kaya Mo 'Yan") and Time magazine-hailed artists Carlos Magno of the band Out Of Body Special and Armi Millare of Up Dharma Down. The latter sings on the upcoming first single, "'Yun Lang".

The band signed up with Star Music (ABS-CBN's label) in 2015.

In 2017, True Faith received an invitation from MGMT to record their own rendition of their then-forthcoming single "Me and Michael," which was eventually included on the band's fourth album, Little Dark Age, released on February 9, 2018. The result of this was True Faith's New Order-inspired Filipino version of the song, titled "Ako at si Michael." MGMT then released a music video of their song which featured True Faith in the narrative. For their part, True Faith came up also with their own video of "Ako at si Michael," which will form part of the new album that they are currently working on.
On 2018, the band released their 10th album "Sentimental". the album were reissue in Vinyl format on 2021.

On March 31, 2019, Former Member and co-founder "Ferdie Marquez" passed away due to heart attack.

2021-Present
In 2021, The band released their new album titled "11". the album consists of three singles “Dyahe,” “Your Ready Smile,” and “Refriend,” was supposed to be released in 2020 but was delayed by the ongoing COVID-19 pandemic.

Current members
Medwin Marfil - lead vocals (1991-present)
Eugene Marfil - acoustic guitar / vocals     (1991-present)
Macky Macaventa - bass guitar (2009-present)
Allan Elgar - lead guitar (2009-present)
Jake Lumacad - keyboards (2014-present)
Kaka Quisumbing - drums (2014-present)

Former members
Caryl Campos (1991-1996)
Eazer Pastor (1991-1996)
Ferdie Marquez (deceased) (1991-1996)
Francis Guevarra (1996-1999)
Yeng Remulla (1996-1999)
Jay Valencia (1996-2003)
Joshua Rubia (1996-2003)
Jun Dizon (1999-2003)
Carlo Sison (1999-2003)
Kenneth Ilagan (2003-2009)
Bimbo Yance (2003-2009)
Benedict Esguerra (2003-2014)
Leo Barrite (2003-2014)

Discography

Albums
Perfect (1993)
Beyond Doubt (1994)
Build (1995)
Looking Up (1997)
Bliss (1998)
Memories Are Cheap: The Best of Truefaith 1993-2000 (February 22, 2000) - Produced by Truefaith and Darrell James Laxamana
Legalized Intense Vague Emotions (L.I.V.E.) (April 19, 2001)
Truefaith Live: MYX-ed Emotions at Halo-Halo (November 23, 2001) - Produced by Darrell James Laxamana
Grace (2002)
Eto Hits...Acoustic (2004)
Stray to Be Found (2006)
Dream Journal: The Very Best of Truefaith 1993-2007 (2007)
Love Parade (2010)
Sentimental (2018)

Collaborations
Make That Cool Thing Happen (Chiclets Promo Single, 1993)
Pasko para sa Lahat: All Star Christmas Album (PolyEast Records, "Formerly Octoarts", 1996)
Acoustic Lokal (Viva Records, 2003)
Tunog Acoustic (Warner Music Philippines, 2003)
Acoustic Natin (Universal Records, 2004)
Acoustic Natin 2 (Universal Records, 2005)
Pinoy Ako (Star Music, 2005)
Pinoy Ako 2 (Star Music, 2006)
Pinoy Biggie Hits Vol. 2 (Star Music, 2006)
The Best of OPM Acoustic Songs (Universal Records, 2005)
Superbands (Universal Records, 2005)
Bandang Pinoy, Lasang Hotdog (Sony BMG Music Philippines, Repackaged 2006)
Kami nAPO Muna Ulit (Universal Records, 2007)
Toblerone National Thank You Day (2007)
Unforgettable Kisses: Hershey’s 100th. Anniversary (2007)
Acoustic Best: All Original Artists (Ivory Music, 2010)
A Perfectly Acoustic Experience (PolyEast Records, 2011)

Soundtracks
Sana Maulit Muli: The Teleserye Soundtrack (Star Music, 2007)

Singles
"Perfect"
"Ambon"
"Huwag Na Lang Kaya"
"Muntik nang Maabot ang Langit"
"Hi!"
"Alaala"
"Sa Puso Ko"
"Baliw"
"Awit Para (Sa Kanya)"
"Kung O.K. Lang Sa'yo" (2000)
"Sumasarap ang Gising"
"Dedma"
"Dahil Ikaw"
"Sayang ang Lahat"
"Araw't Gabi"
"'Yun Lang"
"Pangako"
"Lihim"
"Uwian Na"
"Paano Ka Magiging Akin"

Cover songs
"Ikaw ang Miss Universe ng Buhay Ko" (Original by Hot Dog Band)
"Mistake Number 3" (Original by Culture Club)
"Wala Nang Hahanapin Pa" (Original by APO Hiking Society)
"Cross My Heart" (Original by Everything But The Girl)
"Different Seasons" (Original by Johnny Hates Jazz)

Awards and nominations

References

Musical groups established in 1991
Filipino alternative rock groups
Musical groups from Quezon City
PolyEast Records artists
Star Music artists
Viva Records (Philippines) artists